Tripod: Pod August Night (commonly abbreviated PAN) is a DVD recording of the last performance of 'The Triumphant Return of Pod August Nights' by the Australian comedy act Tripod. The performance occurred at the Northcote Social Club in Northcote, Victoria, on 25 August 2005.

The DVD includes extras such as additional footage from the show under 'Melbourne Supplement', a documentary of Tripod's beginnings, a short sketch entitled 'A Pickpocket's Tale' and the filmclip of 'Gonna Make You Happy Tonight'.

Track listing
"Krap Karate"
"Lingering Dad" 
"The Hairs on my Back" 
"Playing Online"
"My Humanity"
"Fear of Shorts"
"That's Why I'm Sending You" 
"The Hotdog Man"
"Birthday" 
"Prostitutes" 
"Gonna Make You Happy Tonight"
"Justin"
“Paranoid Android” (Radiohead cover)

References

2006 video albums
Tripod (band) albums
2006 live albums